Tettigidea lateralis, known generally as black-sided pygmy grasshopper, is a species of pygmy grasshopper in the family Tetrigidae. Other common names include the black-sided grouse locust and sedge grouse locust. It is found in the Caribbean Sea, North America, and the Caribbean.

Subspecies
These two subspecies belong to the species Tettigidea lateralis:
 Tettigidea lateralis cazieri Rehn & Grant, 1958
 Tettigidea lateralis lateralis (Say, 1824)

References

External links

 

Tetrigidae
Articles created by Qbugbot
Insects described in 1824